The Ranking of liturgical days in the Roman Rite is a regulation for the liturgy of the Roman Catholic church. It determines for each liturgical day which observance has priority when liturgical dates and times coincide (or "occur"), which texts are used for the celebration of the Holy Mass and the Liturgy of the hours and which liturgical color is assigned to the day or celebration.

Ranks 
Each day in the Catholic liturgical calendar has a rank. The five basic ranks for the Ordinary Form of the Roman Rite, in descending order of importance, are as follows:

 Solemnity—the highest ranking type of feast day. It commemorates an event in the life of Jesus or Mary, or celebrates a Saint important to the whole Church or the local community. The Mass of a solemnity has proper readings and prayers, the Gloria and Credo are recited, and occasionally there will be use of incense, a processional hymn and procession, and a recessional hymn/recession. Outside of Advent, Lent and Eastertide, a solemnity falling on a Sunday is celebrated in place of the Sunday. The equivalent type in the older Tridentine or Extraordinary Form of the Roman Rite and the 1962 Missal of Pope John XXIII would be a I Class Feast.
 Feast—the rank of secondary liturgical days including lesser events in the life of Jesus, Mary or an Apostle (theologically speaking) or for major saints. The Gloria is recited but not the Credo, and there are proper readings and prayers for the feast. A Feast pertaining to the Lord (e.g. Transfiguration) falling on a Sunday during Ordinary Time replaces the Sunday Liturgy and such will have the Credo recited at Mass. The equivalent in the older Tridentine or Extraordinary Form of the Roman Rite and the 1962 Missal of Pope John XXIII would be a II Class Feast.
 Memorial—the commemoration of a saint of lesser importance. Many memorials are optional or only observed in specific dioceses, regions or nations. The equivalent in the Tridentine/Extraordinary Form would be a III Class Feast.
 Seasonal Weekday—a weekday in a "strong" liturgical season (Advent, Christmastide, Lent, or Eastertide), on which no solemnity, feast, or memorial happens to be observed. On Weekdays of Lent memorials are celebrated as optional memorial and such liturgy of Lent shall be used. The equivalent in the Extraordinary Form would be I, II and III Class Ferial days, and the even older Tridentine forms would be classified as Major Ferials.
 Feria or Ferial Weekday—a weekday in ordinary time on which no solemnity, feast or memorial happens to be observed. The equivalent in the Extraordinary Form would be a IV Class Ferial, and in the older Tridentine forms would be Minor Ferials.

All holy days of obligation are also solemnities; however, not all solemnities are holy days of obligation. For example, The Nativity of the Lord Jesus (Christmas) (25 December) is a solemnity which is always a holy day of obligation, whereas the Nativity of Saint John the Baptist (24 June) is not a holy day of obligation.

History
The ranking of feast days of saints and of Christian mysteries such as the Ascension of the Lord, which had grown from an original division between doubles and simples.

What the original meaning of the term "double" may have been is not entirely certain. Some think that the greater festivals were thus styled because the antiphons before and after the psalms were "doubled", i.e. twice repeated entire on these days. Others, with more probability, point to the fact that before the ninth century in certain places, for example at Rome, it was customary on the greater feast days to recite two sets of Matins, the one of the feria or week-day, the other of the festival. Hence such days were known as "doubles".

The Catholic Encyclopedia of 1907 shows the incremental crowding of the calendar with the following table based on the official revisions of the Roman Breviary in 1568, 1602, 1631 and 1882, and on the situation in 1907:

In 1907, when, in accordance with the rules in force since the time of Pope Pius V, feast days of any form of double, if impeded by "occurrence" (falling on the same day) with a feast day of higher class, were transferred to another day, this classification of feast days was of great practical importance for deciding which feast day to celebrate on any particular day.

Pope Pius X changed things considerably in his 1911 reform of the Roman Breviary.  Further retouches were made by Pope Pius XII in 1955, by Pope John XXIII in 1960, and by Pope Paul VI in 1969.

The 1969 revision by Pope Paul VI divided feast days into "solemnities", "feasts" and "memorials". While some of the memorials are considered obligatory, others are optional, permitting a choice on some days between two or three memorials, or between one or more memorials and the celebration of the feria. On a day to which no obligatory celebration is assigned, the Mass may be of any saint mentioned in the Roman Martyrology for that day.

Sundays
Pope John XXIII's Code of Rubrics divided Sundays into two classes. Sundays of the I class were the four of Advent, the four of Lent, the two of Passiontide, Easter Sunday, the Octave of Easter (in some traditions, called "Low Sunday"), and Pentecost. No feast whatsoever could replace the celebration of these Sundays, with the sole exception of the feast of the Immaculate Conception. All other Sundays were of II class, and outranked feasts of II class, with the exception that feasts of the Lord, whether I or II class, which replaced the celebration of any II class Sunday on which they happened to fall.

The 1955 reform of Pope Pius XII did not have this division of Sundays into classes. Instead it laid down that the Sundays of Advent and Lent and those that follow up to Low Sunday, and also Pentecost Sunday, are celebrated as doubles of the first class, and outrank all feasts; but when feasts of the first class occur on the second, third or fourth Sunday of Advent, Masses of the Feast are permitted. Sundays previously celebrated in the semi-double rite were raised to the double rite. A feast of our Lord occurring on a Sunday per annum was to take the place of the Sunday.

Ferias
In addition to his division of festal days and Sundays, Pope John XXIII introduced a division of ferias into four classes:
 First-class ferias, outranking all feasts: Ash Wednesday and all the weekdays of Holy Week.
 Second-class ferias, outranking local second-class feasts: ferias of Advent from 17 December to 23 December, and Ember Days of Advent, Lent and September.
 Third-class ferias: ferias in Lent from Thursday after Ash Wednesday to Saturday before the Second Sunday of the Passion (Palm Sunday) except Ember Days (these outranked third-class feasts), and ferias in Advent up to 16 December except Ember Days (these were outranked by third-class feasts).

Before that, ferias were either "major" or "minor". The major, which must have at least a commemoration, even on the highest feasts, were those of Advent and Lent, the Ember days, and the Monday of Rogation week; the others were called minor. Of the major ferias Ash Wednesday and the days of Holy Week were privileged, so that their office must be taken, no matter what feast might occur.

Ember days are four separate sets of three days within the same week—specifically, the Wednesday, Friday, and Saturday—roughly equidistant in the circuit of the year, that were formerly set aside for fasting and prayer. These days set apart for special prayer and fasting were considered especially suitable for the ordination of clergy. The Ember Days are known in Latin as quatuor tempora (the "four seasons"), or jejunia quatuor temporum ("fasts of the four seasons"). They occur in the weeks between the third and fourth Sundays of Advent, between the first and second Sundays of Lent, between Pentecost and Trinity Sunday, and beginning the first Wednesday after the Exaltation of the Holy Cross (September 14), which is between the liturgical third and fourth Sundays of September.

Vigils
In early times, every feast had a vigil, but the increase in the number of feasts and abuses connected with the evening and night service of which the vigils originally consisted, led to their diminishment. Nevertheless, the Roman Rite kept many more vigils than other Latin liturgical rites such as the Ambrosian Rite and the Mozarabic Rite, and if they fell on a Sunday transferred them to the previous Saturday.

In the Tridentine Calendar, there were initially seventeen vigils (excluding The Vigil of Easter on Holy Saturday morning), divided into "major vigils" and "minor" or "common vigils". Christmas, the Epiphany and Pentecost comprised the major vigils. The common vigils included the Ascension of Our Lord, Saint John the Baptist, the Assumption of the Blessed Virgin Mary and All Saints. Most feasts of the Apostles also had vigils, namely Saints Andrew, Thomas, James, Simon and Jude. Whilst the vigils of the Immaculate Conception, Saints Peter and Paul, Saint Lawrence, Saint Bartholomew and Saint Matthew remained, they soon came to be impeded by higher-ranking feasts added to the calendar, and they were instead commemorated as part of other Masses rather than observed in their own right. The Vigil of St. Matthias was unique, in that it was normally commemorated on 23 February, the feast of St. Peter Damian, but in leap years was kept on 24 February, the leap day of the Roman calendar.

Pope Pius XII divided Vigils into only two classes: "privileged vigils" (Christmas and Pentecost) and "common vigils" (Ascension of Our Lord, Assumption of the Blessed Virgin Mary, Saint John the Baptist, Saints Peter and Paul, Saint Lawrence). All other vigils, even those in local calendars, were suppressed. The vigils of Saints Peter and Paul and Saint Lawrence, however, continued to be impeded by higher-ranking feasts.

In Pope John XXIII's 1960 Code of Rubrics, Vigils were divided into three classes. The Easter Vigil was left out of the calculations, being celebrated in a different way from that of other Vigils. The Vigils of Christmas and Pentecost were of the I class, and took precedence over any feast. The II class Vigils were those of the Ascension of Our Lord, the Assumption of the Blessed Virgin Mary, Saint John the Baptist, and Saints Peter and Paul; they took precedence over liturgical days of III or IV class.

Octaves
The Tridentine Calendar had many octaves, without any indication in the calendar itself of distinction of rank between them, apart from the fact that the Octave Day (the final day of the octave) was ranked higher than the days within the octave. Several octaves overlapped, so that, for instance, on 29 December the prayer of the saint of the day, Saint Thomas Becket, was followed by the prayers of Christmas Day, of Saint Stephen, of Saint John the Evangelist and of the Holy Innocents. The situation remained such until the reform of Pope Pius X.

In Pope Pius XII's reform, only the octaves of Christmas, Easter and Pentecost were kept. The days within the Easter and Pentecost octaves were raised to double rite, had precedence over all feasts, and did not admit commemorations.

References

Liturgical calendars of the Catholic Church
 
Roman Rite
Catholic liturgical law
Lists of days